Jingpo Lacus is a lake in the north polar region of Titan, the planet Saturn's largest moon. It and similarly sized Ontario Lacus are the largest known bodies of liquid on Titan after the three maria (Kraken Mare, Ligeia Mare, and Punga Mare). It is composed of liquid hydrocarbons (mainly methane and ethane). It is west of Kraken Mare at 73° N, 336° W, roughly 240 km (150 mi) long, similar to the length of Lake Onega on Earth. Its namesake is Jingpo Lake, a lake in China.

Specular reflection
On 8 July 2009, Cassini's Visual and Infrared Mapping Spectrometer (VIMS) observed a specular reflection in 5 µm infrared light off Jingpo Lacus at 71° N, 337° W. (This has sometimes been described less accurately as at the southern shoreline of Kraken Mare.) Specular reflections indicate a smooth, mirror-like surface, so the observation corroborated the inference of the presence of a large liquid body drawn from radar imaging. The observation was made soon after the north polar region emerged from 15 years of winter darkness.

Gallery

See also 

 Lakes of Titan

Notes

References

External links 

Map of the liquid bodies in the north polar region of Titan

Lakes of Titan (moon)